The Finnish pavilion houses Finland's national representation during the Venice Biennale arts festivals.

Background 

Since 2013, the Frame Contemporary Art Finland foundation has commissioned and produced exhibitions for the Finnish pavilion as part of its mission to promote contemporary Finnish art.

Organization and building 

The pavilion, designed by Alvar Aalto, was built between 1955 and 1956. It was later restored by Fredrik Fogh between 1976 and 1982. The building was briefly lent to Iceland following the restoration, but has been used by Finland since.

Representation by year

Art 

 2005 — Jaakko Heikkilä
 2007 — Maaria Wirkkala
 2011 — Vesa-Pekka Rannikko (Curator: Laura Köönikkä)
 2013 — Antti Laitinen, Terike Haapoja (Curators: Mika Elo, Marko Karo Harri Laakso)
 2015 — IC-98 – Visa Suonpää, Patrik Söderlund (Curator: Taru Elfving)
 2017 — Erkka Nissinen, Nathaniel Mellors (Curator: Xander Karskens)
 2019 — Miracle Workers Collective
 2021 — Pilvi Takala

References

Bibliography

Further reading

External links 

 

Finnish art
National pavilions